The discography of Deana Carter, an American country music singer, consists of seven studio albums and 18 singles. She debuted in 1995 with two test singles released in the United Kingdom before entering the Hot Country Songs charts in 1996 with "Strawberry Wine", the first of three number-one singles from her album Did I Shave My Legs for This? Her second and third albums, Everything's Gonna Be Alright and I'm Just a Girl, also produced top 40 hits at country radio.

Studio albums

1990s

2000s–2010s

Compilation albums

Live albums

Extended plays

Singles

1990s

2000s and 2010s

Other appearances
These recordings were only commercially released through compilations or other artists.

Music videos
Most of Carter's singles have featured music videos. An album-cut, "I've Loved Enough to Know", featured a video. Deana Carter also released a video for her rendition of "Once Upon a December".

References

Carter, Deana
Discographies of American artists